Bam is a nickname. Notable people with the name include:

 Bam Adebayo (born 1997), American basketball player
 Bam Aquino (born 1977), Filipino politician
 Bam Childress (born 1982), American retired National Football League player
 Bam Cunningham (born 1950), American retired National Football League player
 Bam Margera (born 1979), professional skateboarder and television personality
 Bam Morris (born 1972), American retired National Football League player

See also
 
 
Bam Bam (disambiguation)

Lists of people by nickname